UFC on Fox: Alvarez vs. Poirier 2 (also known as UFC on Fox 30) was a mixed martial arts event produced by the Ultimate Fighting Championship held on July 28, 2018 at the Scotiabank Saddledome in Calgary, Alberta, Canada.

Background
The event was the second that the promotion has contested in Calgary, following UFC 149 in July 2012.

A lightweight rematch between former two-time Bellator Lightweight Champion and former UFC Lightweight Champion Eddie Alvarez and Dustin Poirier was the main event of the card. Their first bout at UFC 211 in May 2017 was ruled a no contest after Alvarez hit a downed Poirier with illegal knees in the second round.

A light heavyweight bout between Gadzhimurad Antigulov and Ion Cuțelaba was previously scheduled for UFC 217. However, Antigulov pulled out of the fight due to injury and the bout was scrapped. The matchup eventually happened at this event.

Results

Bonus awards
The following fighters received $50,000 bonuses:
Fight of the Night: John Makdessi vs. Ross Pearson
Performance of the Night: Dustin Poirier and José Aldo

See also
List of UFC events
2018 in UFC
List of current UFC fighters

References

Events in Calgary
Fox UFC
Mixed martial arts in Canada
Sports competitions in Calgary
2018 in Canadian sports
2018 in mixed martial arts
July 2018 sports events in Canada